The Ziyuan (or "Essays on Chinese Characters") was a Chinese dictionary attributed to the Eastern Jin Dynasty scholar Ge Hong. The original text was lost, and the small modern Ziyuan recension has 34 headwords, mostly Chinese Buddhist loanword terminology. 

The Ziyuan is notable for having the first occurrence of the Chinese borrowing ta (塔; tǎ; t'a; "tower; pagoda"). Feng (2004:205) classifies ta as a "monosyllabic phonemic loanword," and notes:
塔/ta/=浮屠/futu/=浮图/futu/=佛图/futu/=数斗波/shudoupo/=兜婆/doupo/：Buddhist tower: "塔,佛堂也 [The ta is Buddhist tower]" (字苑), "作九层浮图 To build the Buddhist tower with nine levels" (水经注), "塔亦胡言, 犹宗庙也. [ta comes from languages of Hu nationalities, it means tower.]" (魏书). It was borrowed from buddhastupa of Sanskrit. The process of pronunciation change is as follows: Buddhastupa stupa tupa t’ap.

References
Feng Zhiwei, "The Semantic Loanwords and Phonemic Loanwords in Chinese Language", Proceedings for 11th International Symposium, The National Institute for Japanese Language, pp. 200–229, 2004, Tokyo.

External links
The Origin of Pagodas, China Through a Lens

Chinese dictionaries
Chinese Buddhist texts
Jin dynasty (266–420) literature